Polo Joe is a 1936 American comedy film directed by William C. McGann and starring Joe E. Brown, Carol Hughes and Richard 'Skeets' Gallagher. The screenplay concerns a man who, despite his fear of horses, takes up polo to impress a woman.

It was Brown's final film for Warner Brothers before he left the studio to make films for producer David L. Loew. This move did serious damage to his career.

Partial cast
 Joe E. Brown as Joe Bolton  
 Carol Hughes as Mary Hilton  
 Richard 'Skeets' Gallagher as Haywood  
 Joe King as Colonel Hilton  
 Wild Bill Elliott as Don Trumbeau  
 Fay Holden as Aunt Minnie  
 George E. Stone as First Loafer  
 Olive Tell as Mrs. Hilton  
 David Newell as Jack Hilton  
 Milton Kibbee as Marker  
 Frank Orth as Bert  
 John Kelly as Rusty 
 Sam McDaniel as Harvey
 Charley Foy as Second Loafer

References

Bibliography
 Wes D. Gehring. Joe E. Brown: Film Comedian and Baseball Buffoon. McFarland, 2006.

External links
 

1936 films
1936 comedy films
American comedy films
Films directed by William C. McGann
Warner Bros. films
American black-and-white films
1930s English-language films
1930s American films